Rafael Estrada was a Mexican film actor. He appeared in more than sixty films during his career.

Selected filmography
 Where the Circle Ends (1956)
 The Road of Life (1956)
The Life of Agustín Lara (1959)
 His First Love (1960)
 Three Black Angels (1960)

References

Bibliography
 Cotter, Bob. The Mexican Masked Wrestler and Monster Filmography. McFarland & Company, 2005.

External links

Year of birth unknown
Year of death unknown
Mexican male film actors